Bag-Notar is a village in Bagnotar Union Council, Abbottabad Tehsil, Abbottabad District, Khyber Pakhtunkhwa, Pakistan. According to the 2017 Census of Pakistan,   the population of Bag-Notar is 4,158.

References

Populated places in Abbottabad District